Alejandra Fuentes Persson (born December 31, 1983) is a diver from Venezuela, who competed at the 2000 Summer Olympics for her native country. She claimed two gold medals at the 2008 South American Swimming Championships in São Paulo.

References
 

1983 births
Living people
Venezuelan female divers
Divers at the 2000 Summer Olympics
Divers at the 2007 Pan American Games
Olympic divers of Venezuela
Central American and Caribbean Games silver medalists for Venezuela
Competitors at the 2006 Central American and Caribbean Games
Central American and Caribbean Games medalists in diving
Pan American Games competitors for Venezuela
21st-century Venezuelan women